April Michelle Bowlby is an American actress and model. She is known for portraying Kandi on the CBS comedy series Two and a Half Men (2006–2015), Stacy Barrett on Drop Dead Diva (2009–2014), and Rita Farr on Titans (2018) and Doom Patrol (2019–present).

Early life
Bowlby was born in Vallejo, California. She moved to Manteca, California, as a child, and attended East Union High School. She studied ballet, French, and marine biology at Moorpark College, and began a modelling career before deciding to pursue acting. She studied drama with Ivana Chubbuck.

Career
Bowlby secured the role of Kandi on the television series Two and a Half Men within months of her first auditions. She is also known for her role as Stacy Barrett in Drop Dead Diva. She played Barney Stinson's obsessive ex-girlfriend Meg in How I Met Your Mother, and has made appearances in CSI, Psych, and CSI: NY. She has appeared in films such as All Roads Lead Home (2008), The Slammin' Salmon (2009), and From Prada to Nada (2011).

She plays Rita Farr in the show Titans, as well as its spin-off series Doom Patrol.

Filmography

Film

Television

References

External links

21st-century American actresses
Actors from Vallejo, California
Actresses from California
American film actresses
American television actresses
Living people
Moorpark College alumni
People from Manteca, California
Year of birth missing (living people)